Kōhei, Kohei or Kouhei (written: , , , , , , , , , , , , , or ) is a masculine Japanese given name. Notable people with the name include:

, Japanese long-distance runner
, Mongolian sumo wrestler
, Japanese shogi player
, Japanese footballer
, Japanese footballer
, Japanese footballer
, Japanese manga artist
, Japanese footballer
, Japanese writer
, Japanese footballer
, Japanese footballer
, Japanese footballer
, Japanese footballer
, Japanese actor and voice actor
, Japanese boxer
, Japanese actor
, Japanese footballer
Kouhei Matsunaga (born 1978), Japanese musician
Kohei Mihara (disambiguation), multiple people
, Japanese footballer
, Japanese ice hockey player
, Japanese voice actor
, Japanese professional baseball player
, Japanese judge
, Japanese footballer
, Japanese film director and screenwriter
, Japanese footballer
, Japanese politician
, Japanese footballer
, Japanese cross-country skier
, Japanese footballer
, Japanese actor
, Japanese sumo wrestler
, Japanese composer
, Japanese footballer
, Japanese footballer
, Japanese footballer
, Japanese cyclist
, Japanese artistic gymnast
, Japanese sumo wrestler
, Japanese footballer
Kohei Yamamoto (disambiguation), multiple people
, Japanese football defender
, Japanese photographer

Japanese masculine given names